Boof may refer to:

People
 Kola Boof, Sudanese-American novelist
 John Boof Bonser (born 1981), American retired Major League Baseball pitcher
 Darren Lehmann (born 1970), Australian former cricketer nicknamed "Boof"
 Kelly Lindsey (born 1979), American soccer coach and former player nicknamed "Boof"
 Ryan Battaglia (born 1992), Australian baseball player nicknamed "Boof"

Arts and entertainment
 Boof, a comic book series from Image Comics
 Gary "Boof" Head, fictional character on the Australian soap opera Neighbours
 Lisa "Boof" Marconi, character in the movie Teen Wolf

Other uses
 Boofing or the boof stroke, a maneuver in whitewater kayaking
 Boofing, a slang term for an alcohol enema
 Boofing, a generalized slang term for the rectal administration of a drug 

Lists of people by nickname